The Hi-Point Model C-9 is a polymer-framed, semi-automatic, blowback-operated pistol manufactured by Hi-Point Firearms.
It is chambered in 9×19mm Parabellum and is rated to accept +P ammunition. It became well known for its low retail price of under $200. An improved model, the YC9, was originally expected for release by late 2019, but it is still not available as of 2022.

Model C-9
The Model C-9 is a compact, single-stack magazine, model of Hi-Point's 9×19mm handgun. It consists of a polymer
frame, zinc-alloy slide and bolt (with steel reinforcing inserts), and a steel breech, chamber and barrel. Its low price and small and compact design prompted many to purchase it for concealed carry.  Some decline to carry the C9 in Condition One ("cocked and locked" - generally considered to be the preferable condition for defensive carry) because of the striker fired design which lacks a firing pin block.

Hi-Point's handguns use a blowback design similar to that used in the Walther PPK and Russian Makarov PM. In blowback weapons the mass of the slide and bolt absorbs the rearward force generated by the propulsion of the bullet. As the pressure drops to a safe level, the slide moves back (along with the bolt), an extractor hooks the empty casing and pulls it out of the chamber, after which the case is ejected from the weapon by the ejector. When the slide has completed its rearward travel, the recoil spring moves the slide forward, chambering another round. Many, if not most, modern handguns use a locked-breech design and therefore do not require the amount of slide mass that the blowback design requires in order to remain comfortable to shoot, safe to fire, and easy to control during the firing process.

Model C-9 Comp.
The C-9 Comp. (short for "Compensated") is the larger version of Hi-Point's 9 mm handgun. Its major difference from the C-9 Compact is that it has a specially designed "compensator" attached to the end of the barrel. The compensator works as a muzzle brake, by forcing some of the hot gases escaping behind the bullet to go upward through specially drilled holes in the top of the compensator. The escaping gases push the end of the gun downward; helping to eliminate some of the upward motion caused by the natural recoil of the gun.  The underside of the C-9 Comp. has been machined with rails to accept the addition of accessories such as a flashlight or laser sights for better target identification.

Another difference between the C-9 and C-9 Comp. is the barrel length. Its 4" barrel is 1/2" longer than its sister weapon's providing for better accuracy and balance. The compensator and extra bulk also increase the weight. Weighing in at 35 oz., it is 6 oz. heavier than the new model, and 2 oz. heavier than the older model of the C-9 Compact.

YC9 
The YC9, an improved version of the C-9, was developed in 2019. The pistol's name was decided after an online contest, in which Yeet Cannon received 313,000 votes, over 96% of the total. The weapon's length, weight, and caliber are identical to the C-9, but it features a new safety, new grip texturing, "Glock-style" front sights, and an elongated sight base, allowing for a Picatinny rail. Limited numbers of C-9s with YEET Cannon G1 marked on the slide became available starting on July 17, 2019. YC9s were planned to become available for sale in 2020, but as of 2022 the model was not available for consumers.

Criticisms
The C-9, C-9 Compensated, and other Hi-Point handguns have been criticized for their weight.

Like other Hi-Point pistols, field stripping the C-9 requires the use of a small punch or a small screwdriver and a hammer to remove a spring pin in the receiver. The weapon's overall reliability has been questioned because of different kinds of jamming: misfeed and failure to return to battery among others.

See also
 Hi-Point Firearms
 Hi-Point CF-380
 Hi-Point Model 40SW
 Hi-Point .45 ACP
 Hi-Point Carbine

References

Semi-automatic pistols of the United States
9mm Parabellum semi-automatic pistols